The Church of Our Lady of Victory is a Black Catholic parish in the Diocese of Brooklyn, located at Throop Avenue and Macdonough Street in New York. The parish was established in 1868.

History 
The church was built between 1891 and 1895 to the designs of architect Thomas F. Houghton. OLOV is a classic Gothic style church, made of dark Manhattan schist trimmed with white limestone.

Due to a decrease in the population at nearby parishes, in 2011 Bishop Nicholas DiMarzio ordered for the church to be merged with Holy Rosary and St. Peter Claver, forming a new parish: St. Martin De Porres. 

The current pastor is Fr. Alonzo Cox, at one point the youngest pastor in the diocese.

2017-2018 marked its 150th anniversary.

References

External links
 www.smdpp.org Parish website

Religious organizations established in 1868
Roman Catholic churches in Brooklyn
Roman Catholic churches completed in 1895
19th-century Roman Catholic church buildings in the United States
1868 establishments in New York (state)
African-American Roman Catholic churches